Fiona Jean McDonald is a New Zealand physiologist, professor and head of the McDonald Lab and the Department of Physiology at the University of Otago.

Academic career 
McDonald was born in Roxburgh, New Zealand. After graduating from St Hilda's Collegiate School in Dunedin she completed a BSc at the University of Otago. She then studied at the University of Oxford for a DPhil for her thesis, "Studies on the role of FGF-4 in mouse development". In 2011 McDonald was awarded a Fulbright scholarship to study the function of a protein named COMMD10 at the University of Texas Southwestern Medical Center in Dallas. Returning to her position at Otago, she was promoted to full professor, with effect from 1 February 2020.

Awards and honours 
In 2005, McDonald was awarded the Research Medal by the New Zealand Association of Scientists, for "her outstanding physiological research over the last 3 years".

Selected works

References

External links 

 

Living people
Year of birth missing (living people)
Alumni of the University of Oxford
Academic staff of the University of Otago
People from Roxburgh, New Zealand
New Zealand physiologists
New Zealand women academics